Xerophyta elegans is a species of plants in the family Velloziaceae. It is endemic to South Africa and its natural distribution and habitat is restricted to Drakensberg Mountains in Mpumalanga province. The plant is evergreen and similar to other members of its family it is able to express high level or tolerance against desiccation and even long treatment with sulphuric acid under dry conditions leaves it able to revive and restart its photosynthetic abilities. Talbotia produces narrow but long, leathery leaves and white star-shaped flowers with yellow stamens. The seeds are hooked thus enhancing dispersal by animals.

References

External links 

 Xerophyta elegans at The Plant List
 Xerophyta elegans at Tropicos

Velloziaceae
Plants described in 1875
Taxa named by John Gilbert Baker
Taxa named by John Hutton Balfour